The Fable of the Roistering Blades is a 1915 short film directed by Richard Foster Baker, based upon a story by George Ade, and starring Wallace Beery and Charles J. Stine.  The silent short was produced by the Essanay Film Manufacturing Company and distributed by the General Film Company. Beery was thirty years old at the time of filming.

Cast
 Wallace Beery as Milt
 Charles J. Stine as Henry

External links
  The Fable of the Roistering Blades in the Internet Movie Database

1915 films
American black-and-white films
American silent short films
1915 comedy films
1910s American films